Lanham is an unincorporated community in both Washington County, Kansas and Gage County, Nebraska, United States.  The Kansas-Nebraska state line runs down its main street.  It is located along State Line Road, about 0.6 miles west of K-148/Nebraska Highway 112.  Also, it is 7 miles north of Hanover, Kansas and 6.5 miles from Odell, Nebraska.

History    
Lanham was named for a railroad official.   A post office was opened in Lanham (on the Kansas side) in 1914, and remained in operation until 1923.

References

Further reading

External links
 Washington County Kansas maps: Current, Historic, KDOT

Unincorporated communities in Washington County, Kansas
Unincorporated communities in Gage County, Nebraska
Unincorporated communities in Kansas
Unincorporated communities in Nebraska